Derek Elliston Michael Malcolm (born 12 May 1932) is an English film critic.

Son of J. Douglas Malcolm (died 1967) and Dorothy Vera (died 1964; née Elliston-Taylor), Malcolm was educated at Eton College and Merton College, Oxford. As a child he expressed an interest in film, often going to the newsreel cinema on Victoria station. He worked for several decades as a film critic for The Guardian, having previously been an amateur jockey and the paper's first horse racing correspondent. In 1977, he was a member of the jury at the 27th Berlin International Film Festival. In the mid-1980s he was host of The Film Club on BBC2, which was dedicated to art house films, and was director of the London Film Festival for several years.

After leaving The Guardian in 2000, he published his final series of articles, The Century of Films, in which he discusses films he admires from his favourite directors from around the world. He became chief film critic for the Evening Standard, before being replaced in 2009 by novelist Andrew O'Hagan. He still contributes film reviews for the newspaper, but it emerged in July 2013 that his contribution to the title was to be reduced further.

In 2008 he was a member of the jury at the 30th Moscow International Film Festival.

Malcolm is president of the British Federation of Film Societies and the International Film Critics' Circle. In 2003 he published an autobiographical book, Family Secrets, which recounts how in 1917 his father shot his mother's lover dead, but was found not guilty of murder.
Malcolm has been married to the journalist and author Sarah Gristwood since 1994.

References

1932 births
Living people
Alumni of Merton College, Oxford
British Film Institute
English film critics
English male journalists
English sportswriters
Film festival directors
People educated at Eton College
The Guardian journalists